Hongwanji Mission School (HMS) is a private co-educational preparatory school (grades pre-school through eighth) located in Nuuanu Valley and adjacent to Downtown Honolulu. Accredited by the Western Association of Schools and Colleges and the Hawaii Association of Independent Schools, HMS first opened its doors in 1949 and was the first Buddhist school established outside Japan.

HMS has a maximum student-teacher ratio of 18:1. Japanese-language classes are part of the curriculum at all grade levels. The campus includes a gymnasium, swimming pool, library, and computer center. In addition, HMS offers after school, holiday daycare, and summer-school programs.

In 2003, HMS announced the opening of a Buddhist high school, Pacific Buddhist Academy, which shares a campus with HMS.

References

See also
 Hongwanji

1949 establishments in Hawaii
Buddhism in Honolulu
Buddhist schools in the United States
Japanese-American culture in Honolulu
Private elementary schools in Hawaii
Private middle schools in Hawaii
Private K–8 schools in the United States
Religious schools in Hawaii
Honpa Hongwanji Mission of Hawaii